The surname Rasmussen is a Danish and Norwegian surname, meaning Rasmus' son. It is the ninth-most-common surname in Denmark, shared by about 1.9% of the population.

People with this name include:

Arts and language 
 Rasmussen (born 1985), Danish singer
 Aaron Frederick Rasmussen Jr. (1915–1984), American microbiologist and immunologist
 Alis Rasmussen (born 1958), American writer known by the name Kate Elliott
 Anne Rasmussen (educator) (born 1959), American ethnomusicologist
 Bill Rasmussen (born 1932), American media figure, first president and CEO of ESPN
 Bruce Rasmussen (born 1961), American television producer
 Carmen Rasmusen (born 1985), Canadian-American singer
 Christina Rasmussen (born 1972), Greek–American crisis intervention counselor and author
 Egil Rasmussen (1903–1964), Norwegian author, literature critic and musician
 Eiler Rasmussen Eilersen (1827–1912), Danish landscape artist
 Ejnar Mindedal Rasmussen (1892–1975), Danish architect
 Eric Rasmussen (academic) (born 1960}. authority on Shakespearean texts 
 Flemming Rasmussen (born 1958), Danish music producer
 Halfdan Rasmussen (1915–2002), Danish poet
 Jens Elmegård Rasmussen (1944–2013), Danish associate professor of Indo-European Studies
 Joel Rasmussen (born 1970), American film producer
 Karen-Lisbeth Rasmussen (born 1944), Danish ceramist and designer
 Karl Aage Rasmussen (born 1947), Danish composer, writer and organizer
 Mary Helen Rasmussen (1930–2008), American musicologist
 Nicolas Rasmussen (born 1962), French-born professor of history at the University of New South Wales
 Rie Rasmussen, (born 1978) Danish actress, model, director and photographer
 Scott Rasmussen (born 1956), American media figure with ESPN and polling company Rasmussen Reports
 Sigrid Horne-Rasmussen (1915–1982), Danish stage and film actress
 Steen Eiler Rasmussen (1898–1990), Danish architect and town-planner
 Rasmus Rasmussen (1862–1932), Norwegian actor and theatre director
 Rasmus Rasmussen (1871–1962), Faroese writer
 Sunleif Rasmussen (born 1961), Faroese composer of classical music

Military 
 Phil Rasmussen (1918–2005), American military pilot stationed at Pearl Harbor during the 1941 Japanese attack
 Robert L. Rasmussen (born 1930), American military artist, former naval aviator
 Stefan G. Rasmussen (born 1947), Danish military and civilian pilot, known for SAS flight 751 crash-landing

Politics and administration 
 Amund Rasmussen Skarholt (1892–1956), Norwegian politician for the Labour Party
 Anne Rasmussen (politician) (born 1971) Danish politician
 Anders Fogh Rasmussen (born 1953), NATO General Secretary, former Prime Minister of Denmark
 Bergur Løkke Rasmussen (born 1990), Danish politician
 Dan Rasmussen (born 1947), American politician, member of the Iowa House of Representatives
 David Rasmussen Hansen (born 1938), United States federal judge
 Dennis F. Rasmussen (born 1947), American politician
 Einar Normann Rasmussen (1907–1975), Norwegian politician for the Liberal Party
 Hjalte Rasmussen (1940–2012), Professor of European Union Law at the University of Copenhagen
 Holger Rasmusen (1894–1983), American politician
 Kapp Rasmussen (1860–1927), American politician
 Lars Løkke Rasmussen (born 1964), former Prime Minister of Denmark, representing the Liberal Party Venstre
 Olav Rasmussen Langeland (1904–1981), Norwegian politician for the Centre Party
 Poul Nyrup Rasmussen (born 1943), MEP and President of the Party of European Socialists (PES), former Prime Minister of Denmark
Søren Egge Rasmussen (born 1961), Danish politician for the Red-Green Alliance
 Stu Rasmussen (born 1948), American politician from the state of Oregon
 Tom Rasmussen (contemporary), former member of the Seattle City Council
 Wilkie Rasmussen (born 1958), Deputy Prime Minister of the Cook Islands

Science, engineering, and technology 
 Angela Rasmussen, American virologist
 David Tab Rasmussen (1958–2014), American biological anthropologist
 Erik N. Rasmussen (born 1957), American meteorologist and tornado researcher
 Greg Rasmussen (born 1955), British wildlife conservation biologist
 Jørgen Skafte Rasmussen (1878–1964), Danish engineer and industrialist
 Knud Rasmussen (1879–1933), Greenlandic polar explorer and anthropologist
 Lars Rasmussen (software developer), creator of Google Maps and Google Wave
 Norman Rasmussen (1927–2003), American physicist
 Pamela C. Rasmussen (born 1959), American ornithologist and expert on Asian birds
 Steen Rasmussen (physicist) (born 1955), Danish artificial life scientist working in the United States

Sports 
 Aage Rasmussen (1889–1983), Danish photographer and track and field athlete
 Alex Rasmussen (born 1984), Danish professional racing cyclist
 Allan Stig Rasmussen (born 1983), Danish chess grandmaster
 Anders Rasmussen (born 1976), Danish professional football player
 Andreas Rasmussen (1893–1967), Danish field hockey player
 Ann-Helen Rasmussen  (born 1990) Samoan New Zealand netball player
 Bjørn Rasmussen (1885–1962), Danish football (soccer) player
 Blair Rasmussen (born 1962), American former professional basketball player
 Bruce Rasmussen (basketball) (born 1950), American director of athletics at Creighton University
 Dale Rasmussen (born 1977), Samoan international rugby union player
 David Rasmussen (born 1976), Danish retired football player
 Dawn Rasmussen, retired athlete and sports administrator from Samoa
 Dennis Rasmussen (born 1959), American Major League Baseball pitcher
 Dorthe Rasmussen (born 1960), Danish long-distance runner
 Drew Rasmussen (born 1995), American baseball player
 Einar Rasmussen (born 1956), Norwegian sprint canoeist
 Eldon Rasmussen (born 1936), Canadian driver in the USAC Championship Car series
 Elton Rasmussen (1937–1978), Australian rugby league player
 Eric Rasmussen (born 1952), American retired professional baseball player
 Erik Rasmussen (ice hockey) (born 1977), American professional ice hockey player
 Erik Rasmussen (footballer) (born 1960), Danish former football player and manager
 Erik Rasmussen (handballer) (born 1959), Danish former handball player
 Flint Rasmussen (born 1968), American rodeo clown in the sport of bull riding
 Flemming Rasmussen (strongman) (born 1968), Danish former strongman
 Grace Rasmussen (born 1988), New Zealand netball player
 Hans Kjeld Rasmussen (born 1954), Danish sports shooter and Olympic champion
 Hans Rasmussen, (1895–1949), American professional baseball pitcher
 Hedevig Rasmussen (1902–1985), Danish freestyle swimmer who competed in the 1924 Summer Olympics
 Jacob Rasmussen (born 1997), Danish footballer
 Jens Rasmussen (speedway rider) (born 1959), former speedway rider who rode in the United Kingdom
 Johanna Rasmussen (born 1983), Danish female football striker
 John Boye Rasmussen (born 1982), Danish handball player
 Jonas Rasmussen (born 1977), Danish badminton player
 Jørgen Rasmussen (footballer, born 1945), Danish footballer (defender)
 Jørgen Rasmussen (footballer born 1937), Danish footballer (attacker)
 Juliane Rasmussen (born 1979), Danish rower
 Karen Maud Rasmussen (1906–1994), Danish freestyle swimmer
 Karl Johan Rasmussen (born 1973), Norwegian long-distance runner who specialized in marathon races
 Kemp Rasmussen (born 1979), American football defensive lineman in the NFL
 Kristen Rasmussen (born 1978), American former professional basketball player in the WNBA
 Kyle Rasmussen (born 1968), American former alpine ski racer
 Lars Rasmussen (handball player) (born 1976), Danish team handball player
 Mads Rasmussen (born 1981), Danish rower and double World Champion in the Lightweight Double Sculls
 Marie Rasmussen (born 1972), Danish pole vaulter
 Mark Rasmussen (born 1983), English striker
 Michael Rasmussen (born 1974), Danish cyclist
 Michael Rasmussen (ice hockey) (born 1999), Canadian professional hockey player
 Morten Rasmussen (football defender) (born 1985), Danish professional football player
 Morten Rasmussen (football striker) (born 1985), Danish professional football player
 Ole Rasmussen (footballer born 1952), Danish former football player with German club Hertha BSC
 Ole Rasmussen (footballer born 1960), Danish football manager and former player
 Peter Rasmussen (badminton) (born 1974), Danish badminton player
 Peter Rasmussen (footballer, born 1967), Danish international football (soccer) player
 Peter Rasmussen (footballer, born 1969), Danish football player for AB
 Peter Rasmussen (referee) (born 1975), Danish football referee
Peter "dupreeh" Rasmussen (born 1993), Danish professional CS:GO player
 Philip Rasmussen (born 1989), Danish professional football midfielder
 Rachel Rasmussen (born 1984), New Zealand netball player
 Randy Rasmussen, American football guard for fifteen seasons for the New York Jets
 Rasmus Rasmussen (1899–1974), Danish gymnast who competed in the 1920 Summer Olympics
 Steffen Rasmussen (born 1982), Danish professional football goalkeeper
 Theis F. Rasmussen (born 1984), Danish football goalkeeper
 Thomas Rasmussen (born 1977), Danish professional football (soccer) player
 Tine Rasmussen (born 1979), female badminton player from Denmark
 Troels Rasmussen (born 1961), Danish former football (soccer) player
 Viktor Rasmussen (1882–1956), Danish gymnast
 Wayne Rasmussen (born 1942), American football player
 Willy Rasmussen (1937–2018), Norwegian javelin thrower

Other 
 Anna Rasmussen, (1898–1983), Danish spiritualist medium
 Jesper Rasmussen Brochmand (1585–1652), Danish Lutheran clergyman, Bishop of Zealand
 Jørgen Guldborg-Rasmussen, Danish scouting figure
 Sherri Rasmussen (1957–1986), American nurse killed by a police officer who had once dated her husband
 Terry Peder Rasmussen (1943–2010), American suspected serial killer involved in the Bear Brook murders

References

Danish-language surnames
Norwegian-language surnames
Patronymic surnames
Surnames from given names